This was the first edition of the tournament.

Ruben Gonzales and Hunter Johnson won the title after defeating Maximilian Marterer and Lukáš Rosol 1–6, 6–2, [10–3] in the final.

Seeds

Draw

References

External links
 Main draw

Bucharest Challenger - Doubles